Chem-Dry (the name stands for CHEMISTRY-DRY) is an American carpet cleaning and upholstery cleaning franchise chain with main offices in Logan, Utah and Nashville, Tennessee.

History 
When it was founded in 1977, it was originally based in California. Chem-Dry began franchising in 1978, and now has over 4000 locations worldwide.

In 2006, Chem-Dry was acquired by The Home Depot.

In 2011, Chem-Dry was sold to Baird Capital Partners which is located in Chicago. This purchase also included N-Hance which specialized in wood cabinet and flooring renewal service. N-Hance has over 200 franchises. In 2018, Baird Capital Partners purchased Delta Restoration Services (formerly Delta Disaster Services) and now offers flood disaster services. In 2019, Chem-Dry became part of the BELFOR Franchise Group and Dan Tarantin, previously Chem-Dry President, became the COO of BFG. Edward Quinlan became President of Chem-Dry in October 2020.

Chem-Dry has been ranked Entrepreneur Magazine's top-rated carpet cleaning franchise for 31 straight years. In the 2020, Franchise 500 list, Entrepreneur Magazine was ranked #74.

References

External links
Chem-Dry Website

Franchises
Business services companies established in 1977
Cleaning companies of the United States
Companies based in Utah
1977 establishments in California